The eastern sand gecko (Stenodactylus leptocosymbotes) is a species of lizard in the family Gekkonidae. The species is found in the Middle East.

References

Stenodactylus
Reptiles described in 1967